The 1920–21 season was the 24th in the history of the Western Football League.

The Division One champions this season were Bristol City Reserves, for the second time in their history. Champions of Division Two were Peasedown St John, who gained promotion to Division One along with Trowbridge Town.

Division One
Eight new clubs joined Division One this season, and the number of clubs increased from 10 to 16 after Horfield United and Newport County Reserves left the league.
Abertillery Town
Cardiff City Reserves, rejoining the league after leaving in 1914
Cardiff Corinthians
Exeter City Reserves
Mid Rhondda
Pontypridd
Ton Pentre, rejoining the league after leaving in 1910
Yeovil and Petters United, promoted from Division Two

Abertillery Town, Mid Rhondda, Pontypridd and Ton Pentre were also members of the Southern League (Welsh section) during this season. All four clubs left the Western League at the end of the season to concentrate on the Southern League.

Division Two
Three new clubs joined Division Two this season, and the number of clubs increased from eight to ten after Yeovil and Petters United were promoted.
Clandown
Radstock Town, rejoining the league after leaving in 1910
Welton Amateurs

References

1920-21
1920–21 in English football leagues
1920–21 in Welsh football